Autoglym is a British manufacturer of a range of car care and valeting products, which are sold in over 45 countries.
 
Established in 1965, and based in Letchworth, Hertfordshire, Autoglym is part of the Altro Group.

The company's products are used by customers such as vehicle manufacturers, distributors, bodyshops, professional valeting companies and transport operators. The product range consists of exterior (chassis, bodywork, wheels), interior and glass care products. It also includes Autoglym LifeShine, a dealer-applied system of treatments that provides long-lasting protection for the paintwork, glass and upholstery of a car.

Autoglym currently holds two Royal Warrants in the UK as Supplier of car care products.

History 
The Autoglym brand was founded in 1965 by a UK Motor Trade entrepreneur Dennis Barley who developed a unique system for renovating used car paintwork. There were 11 products in the original range, including polishes, a sealant, a paint renovator and glass, interior, engine and wheel cleaners. The products were only available to professional valets working in garages and workshops. The company had its manufacturing base in Digswell, trading as Welwyn Plastics. Welwyn Plastics used to produce other liquid products for various other industries, before deciding to concentrate solely on the production of Autoglym products, due to the strong growth of the brand. The sales and administration centre was in Welwyn Garden City trading as Autoglym. The first Autoglym training and product testing facility was established at the Welwyn site, something that has always been a key element in the Autoglym product development and improvement process. Autoglym was purchased by the Altro Group in the mid-1970s.

Expansion 
The Autoglym name was now becoming an open 'trade secret' and due to repeated requests from members of the public the decision was taken to introduce a range aimed at the home enthusiast. In 1986 Autoglym launched their retail range consisting of existing products and some developed especially for home users. As the brand continued to expand Autoglym outgrew their Welwyn site and sought new premises in Letchworth Garden City, adjacent to the Altro Headquarters. Autoglym moved to Letchworth in 1991 allowing increased manufacturing output, larger research and development facilities, larger product testing and development bays and the unification of the sales and manufacturing departments on one site.

1991 also brought about a new line of products, the body shop range. This was developed in response to requests from customers who wanted a silicone free range of compounds, dressings and glass cleaners that would be safe to use in strictly silicone free environments.

ISO accreditation was awarded in 1991 along with a Royal Warrant from the Prince of Wales. The Queen Mothers Royal Warrant followed in 1992.

The Public Service Vehicle division catering to buses, coaches and trains was established at the beginning of 1994.

A line of bespoke motorcycle products was launched in 2001.

The LifeShine new vehicle protection system was launched in 2003.

HM The Queen awarded her Royal Warrant in 2004.

Products

Retail Products

Active Insect Remover

Alloy Wheel Seal
  
Aqua Wax
  
Autofresh
 
Bird Dropping Wipes
  
Bodywork Shampoo Conditioner
  
Bumper & Trim Detailer
  
Bumper & Trim Gel
  
Cabriolet Fabric Hood - Maintenance Kit
  
Car Glass Polish
  
Caravan and Motorhome Cleaner
  
Clean Wheels
  
Custom Wheel Cleaner
  
De-Icer
  
Engine & Machine Cleaner
  
Extra Gloss Protection
  
Fast Glass
  
Glass Spray
  
Hi-Foam Interior Shampoo
  
Hi-Tech Aqua-Dry
  
Hi-Tech Finishing Cloth
  
Hi-Tech Flexi Water Blade
  
Hi-Tech Interior Microfibre
  
Hi-Tech Microfibre Drying Towel
  
Hi-Tech Wheel Brush
  
High Definition Cleanser

High Definition Ceramic Coating
  
High Definition Wax
  
Instant Show Shine
 
Instant Tyre Dressing
  
Intensive Tar Remover
  
Interior Shampoo
  
Leather Care Balm
  
Leather Cleaner
  
Metal Polish
  
Odour Eliminator
 
Paint Renovator
  
Perfect Palm Applicator
  
Perfect Polishing Cloth
  
Pressure Wash
  
Rapid Detailer
   
Satin Matt Black
  
Silicone Spray
  
Silicone-Free Spray
  
Super Resin Polish
  
Surface Detailing Clay Kit
   
Ultra Deep Shine

Ultra High Definition Ceramic Coating

Ultimate Screenwash
  
Vinyl & Rubber Care 
  
Wheel Silver

References

Automotive companies of the United Kingdom
Automotive companies established in 1965
Chemical companies established in 1965
Automotive chemicals
British Royal Warrant holders
1965 establishments in England